The 1994 NCAA Division I Field Hockey Championship was the 14th women's collegiate field hockey tournament organized by the National Collegiate Athletic Association, to determine the top college field hockey team in the United States. The James Madison Dukes won their first championship, defeating the North Carolina Tar Heels in the final The championship rounds were held at Parsons Field in Brookline, Massachusetts on the campus of Northeastern University.

Bracket

References 

1994
Field Hockey
1994 in women's field hockey
1994 in sports in Massachusetts
Women's sports in Massachusetts